The 1986 FIFA World Cup qualification UEFA Group 1 was a UEFA qualifying group for the 1986 FIFA World Cup. The group comprised Albania, Belgium, Greece and Poland.

The group was won on goals scored by Poland, who qualified for the 1986 FIFA World Cup. The runners-up Belgium entered the UEFA play-off stage.

Standings

Results

Goalscorers

3 goals

 Bedri Omuri
 Dariusz Dziekanowski
 Włodzimierz Smolarek

2 goals

 Enzo Scifo
 Franky Vercauteren
 Zbigniew Boniek

1 goal

 Mirel Josa
 Agustin Kola
 Arben Minga
 Nico Claesen
 Erwin Vandenbergh
 Eddy Voordeckers
 Nikos Anastopoulos
 Kostas Antoniou
 Tasos Mitropoulos
 Dimitris Saravakos
 Giorgos Skartados
 Marek Ostrowski
 Andrzej Pałasz

External links
Fifa.com page
Rsssf page
Results and Scorers

1
1984–85 in Polish football
1985–86 in Polish football
1984–85 in Belgian football
1985–86 in Belgian football
1984–85 in Albanian football
1985–86 in Albanian football
1984–85 in Greek football
1985–86 in Greek football